Benthobia complexirhyna is a species of sea snail, a marine gastropod mollusc in the family Benthobiidae.

Description

Distribution

References

Benthobiidae
Gastropods described in 2003